Warner Walmar "Bud" Engdahl (July 1, 1918 – May 11, 1985) was an American professional basketball player. He played for the Oshkosh All-Stars in the National Basketball League during the 1941–42, 1942–43, and 1945–46 seasons. He won an NBL championship in 1941–42. For his career, Engdahl averaged 1.7 points per game.

References

1918 births
1985 deaths
American men's basketball players
United States Army personnel of World War II
Basketball players from Wisconsin
Guards (basketball)
Military personnel from Wisconsin
Oshkosh All-Stars players
Sportspeople from Superior, Wisconsin
Wisconsin–Superior Yellowjackets men's basketball players